Chalermpol Srisawat is a Thai military general.  he serves as Chief of Defence Forces of the Royal Thai Armed Forces.

Education and careers 
Chalermpol study in primary and secondary at Pibulwitthayalai School in Lopburi province and then attending the Armed Forces Academies Preparatory School as a pre-cadet as a prerequisite for attending Chulachomklao Royal Military Academy (CRMA). After graduated in Military school, he studies at Command and General Staff College and National Defence College.

Chalermpol as a soldier in the cavalry, he start his careers as Commander of the 25th Cavalry Battalion at Saraburi and then Chief of Staff of the 2nd Cavalry Division, King Vajiravudh’s Guard. He take part in writing the plan "Chakrabongse Bhuvanath Battle Plan" in the Cambodian–Thai border dispute in 2011. After growing up in the army he has moved to Royal Thai Armed Forces Headquarters as Chief of Staff Royal Thai Armed Forces Headquarters and then became Chief of Defence Forces in 2020.

Awards
  Special Class Order of the Crown of Thailand 
  1st Class Order of the White Elephant
  Freeman Safeguarding Medal - 2nd Class
  Chakra Mala Medal

References 

Living people
1963 births
Chalermpol Srisawat
Chalermpol Srisawat
Chalermpol Srisawat
Chalermpol Srisawat
Chalermpol Srisawat